The 2021–22 Tunisian Ligue Professionnelle 1 (Tunisian Professional League) season was the 96th season of top-tier football in Tunisia.

Espérance de Tunis were the defending champions and successfully defended their title, winning their record-extending 6th consecutive title and 32nd title overall.

The VAR was used in the playoff.

Teams
A total of 16 teams contested the league.

Stadiums and locations

Return of CS Chebba
On 11 September 2021, CS Chebba returned to the league following a vote by the Ordinary General Assembly of the Tunisian Football Federation.

Competition

First round

Group A

Table

Results

Clubs season-progress

Group B

Table

Results

Clubs season-progress

Goals scored per round
This graph represents the number of goals scored during each round:

Playoff

Table

Results

Positions by round
The table lists the positions of teams after each week of matches. In order to preserve chronological evolvements, any postponed matches are not included to the round at which they were originally scheduled, but added to the full round they were played immediately afterwards.

Clubs season-progress

Goals scored per round
This graph represents the number of goals scored during each round:

Playout

Table

Results

Clubs season-progress

Ranking games
The ranking games round were played between the 4th and the 5th from each group from the first round.

Seventh place match

Ninth place match

Season statistics

Top scorers

Final ranking

Number of teams by Governorate

Awards
Each month, Internet users vote for the player of the month sponsored by Foot24 and Coca-Cola.

Media coverage

See also
2021–22 Tunisian Cup

Notes

References

External links
 Fédération Tunisienne de Football

Tunisian Ligue Professionnelle 1 seasons
Tunisia
1